Big Dogz is the twenty-second album by the Scottish rock band Nazareth, released in April 2011. It was produced by Jimmy Murrison.

Track listing 
All songs written by Nazareth

Personnel 
Nazareth
 Dan McCafferty - lead vocals
 Jimmy Murrison - guitars, backing vocals, piano
 Pete Agnew - bass, backing vocals
 Lee Agnew - drums, backing vocals
with:
 Pavel Bohatý - piano (10)
 Yann Roullier - shaker (5), tambourine (7)

Chart performance

References 

Nazareth (band) albums
2011 albums
Edel Music albums